{{Speciesbox
|image = 
|genus = Neoregelia
|parent = Neoregelia subg. Neoregelia
|species = punctatissima|authority = (Ruschi) Ruschi
}}Neoregelia punctatissima is a species of flowering plant in the genus Neoregelia. This species is endemic to Brazil.

Cultivars
 Neoregelia 'Clarise'
 Neoregelia 'Hannibal Lector'
 Neoregelia 'Little Faith'
 Neoregelia 'Moyna Prince'
 Neoregelia 'Natalee Marie'
 Neoregelia 'Sandstorm'
 Neoregelia 'Sparkle'
 Neoregelia 'Sudan'
 Neoregelia 'The Governor's Plea'
 Neoregelia 'Tomfoolery'
 Neoregelia'' 'Winter Bloom'

References

BSI Cultivar Registry Retrieved 11 October 2009

punctatissima
Flora of Brazil